Chris Chester (born 8 October 1978) is an English professional rugby league coach who is the former head coach of Wakefield Trinity in the Betfred Super League and Scotland at international level, and a former professional rugby league footballer.

As a player, Chester played in the forwards for the Halifax, Wigan Warriors, Hull F.C. (with whom he won the 2005 Challenge Cup) and Hull Kingston Rovers in the Super League.

He was the head coach of Hull Kingston Rovers in the Super League, however his resignation was announced in February/March 2016. 

On 10 August 2021, A statement from Wakefield Trinity said that they had parted ways with Head Coach Chris Chester, with Willie Poching talking over as interim coach.

Background

Chester was born in Wakefield, West Yorkshire, England. He attended Kettlethorpe High School whose P.E. teacher at the time was the former Leeds Rugby Union winger and ex-England Head Coach, Stuart Lancaster.

Playing career
The former Stanley Rangers junior was captain of England Schools before he signed as a professional with Halifax. He made an impression in 1998's Super League III, where he was the runner-up for the Young Player of the Year award.

He moved to the Wigan Warriors in 1999 and played from the interchange bench in their 2000 Super League Grand Final defeat by St. Helens. He also played for the Wigan Warriors from the interchange bench in their 2001 Super League Grand Final defeat by the Bradford Bulls.

Chester then moved to Hull FC, and played in the 2005 Challenge Cup Final from the interchange bench in the victory over the Leeds Rhinos. 
After spending seven years at Hull FC, Chester joined the Hull Kingston Rovers for their inaugural season in Super League and played for the club for two seasons.

Coaching career
Chester retired from playing following a serious neck injury and took up a role as first team coach of Hull Kingston Rovers. He has previously been on the coaching staff at Castleford Tigers. In 2014, Chester was promoted to head coach following the departure of Craig Sandercock. In his first full season as head coach Chester guided Hull Kingston Rovers to the 2015 Challenge Cup Final, but his team were soundly beaten. On 24 February 2016, Hull Kingston Rovers dismissed Chris Chester as head coach following the home defeat by Wakefield Trinity (Wildcats) on 21 February 2016, they had gained one point from their opening three matches in Super League XXI.

On 16 March 2016, Chester was appointed Head Coach at Wakefield Trinity with immediate effect following the departure of Brian Smith.

Chester guided Wakefield to 8th position in the table in 2016 and 5th the following season. In 2016, Chester also led Wakefield to a Challenge Cup semi-final.  On 10 August 2021, Chester was terminated as head coach of Wakefield after recording only four wins in the 2021 Super League season and with the club sitting second last on the table.

References

External links

(archived by web.archive.org) Hull Kingston Rovers profile
Wigan Warriors profile
(archived by web.archive.org) SL Stats
 ĎŔƑ "My life in rugby league: Chris Chester" interview at TotalRL.com

1978 births
Living people
English rugby league coaches
English rugby league players
Halifax R.L.F.C. players
Hull F.C. players
Hull Kingston Rovers coaches
Hull Kingston Rovers players
Rugby league players from Wakefield
Rugby league second-rows
Rugby league locks
Scotland national rugby league team coaches
Wakefield Trinity coaches
Wigan Warriors players